The Filmstaar is a 2011 Malayalam film directed by Sanjeev Raj. Dileep and Kalabhavan Mani play lead roles while Muktha and Rambha play supporting roles in the film. The film deals with the relationship between a film star and a villager. The film also features actress  Rambha's last film to date (not only in Malayalam but in all other languages), as her last Tamil & Telugu films were released before her marriage (in 2010) and this was her only film just a year after her wedding took place and after she flew off to settle in Canada.

Plot
The story is about Nandagopan, a villager who writes the story of his own life and sufferings and wants Sooryakiran, who is a South Indian superstar, to make a film based on it. When the meeting finally happens one night, the star is in a foul mood and behaves rudely with Nandan, who abandons the idea of making the film, but leaves the script behind. Sooryakiran, who always boasts of coming up the hard way, reads the script later and is so moved by it that he decides to make the movie.

Nandan's script talks about villagers who have become refugees in their own land due industrialisation and cheating by local politicians. One of the villagers, Sakhavu Raghavan, an activist of Communist Party, died in mysterious circumstances. Nandagopan attempts to unveil the truth behind his murder and is brutally attacked. His family sends him away to Mangalore where he works as an accountant and writes the script which he wants Sooryakiran to make into a film. The film shows Sooryakiran making Nandan's  dream project, overcoming the hurdles put in the way by a caucus of politicians led by a headstrong minister Thampan.

Cast

 Dileep as Nandagopan/Nandu
 Kalabhavan Mani as SuperStar Sooryakiran/Kannan
 Muktha as Gowri, Nandagopan's sister
 Rambha as Film actress
 Thalaivasal Vijay as Sakhavu Raghavan
 Jagathy Sreekumar
 Ganga
 Vijayaraghavan as Appayi
 Chali Pala  as Varadaraja Chettiyar
 Salim Kumar
 Narayanankutty
 Ashokan
 Valsala Menon as Pankajakshi
 Devan as Thampan
 Suraj Venjarammoodu
 Baburaj
 Sadiq
 Anila Sreekumar as Janaki
 Jijoy Rajagopal as Stephen

References

External links
 http://entertainment.oneindia.in/malayalam/top-stories/2010/dileep-scriptwriter-superstar-260310.html
 http://www.nowrunning.com/movie/7057/malayalam/film-star/index.htm

2010s Malayalam-language films